Silvester of Valdiseve (or Valdisieve) (1278–1348) was a medieval monk who is not yet recognized as a saint by the Roman Catholic Church, but rather a Blessed. Silvester was christened Ventura and lived in Florence.  He was involved in the processing of wool (carding and bleaching) until the age of 40 when he became a monk. He entered the Benedictine Camaldolese monastery of Santa Maria degli Angeli, also located in Florence. There, he worked as a cook.

Although unable to read, Silvester thought deeply on theological subjects and was consulted by scholars and monks alike, including the prior. He was also sought for counsel by the Augustinian monk Blessed Simon of Cascia. Silvester also opposed overly harsh penitence by monks. He died at the age of 70.

Sources
Butler, Jones and Burns. Butler's Lives of the Saints. p. 80.
Delaney, John A. "Dictionary of Saints". p. 582

External links
 A number of early versions of the saint's life are included in Leggende di alcuni santi e beati venerati in S. Maria degli Angeli di Firenze, ed. by Casimiro Stolfi (Bologna: Gaetano Romagnoli, 1867).

1288 births
Italian saints
1348 deaths